The Physician and Sportsmedicine is a quarterly peer-reviewed medical journal covering sports medicine. It is published by Informa Healthcare and was established in 1973. The journal is abstracted and indexed in Index Medicus/MEDLINE/PubMed.

References

External links 
 

Sports medicine journals
English-language journals
Taylor & Francis academic journals
Quarterly journals
Publications established in 1973